Roger Pettersson (born 5 April 1972) is a former Swedish tennis player.

Biography
Pettersson, in partnership with fellow Swede Mårten Renström, won the Boys' Doubles title at the 1990 Australian Open. 

His only appearance in the main draw of an ATP event was at the 1990 Swedish Open, where he and partner Douglas Geiwald lost in the first round of the doubles to their compatriots, Rikard Bergh and Ronnie Båthman.

Pettersson attended college in the United States and played collegiate tennis with the UNLV Rebels and earned All-American honours in 1994 in singles and in 1996, for both singles and doubles. He graduated in 1996 with a bachelor’s degree in hotel administration after which the retired from competitive tennis. Pettersson was inducted into the UNLV Athletics Hall of Fame in 2006.

Junior Grand Slam titles

Doubles: 1

References

External links
 
 

1972 births
Living people
Swedish male tennis players
Australian Open (tennis) junior champions
Grand Slam (tennis) champions in boys' doubles
People from Henderson, Nevada
20th-century Swedish people